Junooniyatt is an Indian Hindi language romantic musical drama television series that premiered on 13 February 2023 on Colors TV. Produced by Sargun Mehta and Ravi Dubey, it stars Ankit Gupta, Neha Rana and Gautam Vig.

Plot
The story begins with Elahi sneaking out of her house and entering her best friend Husna's home for a sangeet. There, she sings her mother's song and reminisces about her childhood with her mother. Elahi's aunt overhears her singing and notifies her grandmother, Biji, but Elahi returns home in time. Biji warns her not to sing or else she will be forced into marriage. Elahi's father is an alcoholic, and it is revealed that both her parents used to sing together and captivate everyone's hearts. Her mother had dreams of becoming a famous singer but left home, abandoning her husband and mother. Elahi's passion is singing, and she hopes to find her mother through it.

Elsewhere, Jordan and his band friends make an entry with his rap in a residential area. Meanwhile, in Vancouver, Canada, Jahaan, a wordsmith magician, uses his soulful lyrics to win people's hearts. Jahaan's primary goal is to clear his parents' names and restore their dignity.

Elahi and Jahaan join Chandigarh University, where they meet Jordan. Elahi and Jordan, have a musical battle where Elahi is not impressed with his behaviour. Elahi saves Jahaan from being ragged by Jordan but he tries to avoid her. When Jordan tries to lock Jahaan in the music room, Elahi and Jahaan get locked in instead. Elahi worries about not getting home on time, but Jahaan takes care of her. They spend time together, and Elahi learns more about Jahaan. When Biji finds out that Elahi is locked up, she scolds her, and Jahaan remains locked in the room all night to protect Elahi from getting defamed. The next day, Jahaan tells Elahi to stay away from him, but she apologizes for causing trouble. As she leaves, Jahaan sees a PG poster that Elahi put up to get rent. As Elahi takes the bus to go back home she meets Jahaan on the same bus, both irritated with each other, Elahi and Jahaan get off at the same stop. Elahi thinks Jahaan is following her but she doesn't know that he's just looking for the PG house. Meanwhile, Biji is planning Elahi's marriage without her consent to an abusive man whose wife divorced him due to domestic abuse. Jahaan reaches the PG, which is close to Elahi's house, and later starts playing the harmonica. Elahi listens to the music and tries to find the person playing it. Meanwhile, Jordan is affected by Elahi's words about his music and wants to impress her The next morning, as Elahi helps at Husna's sisters' wedding, she hears the same music and follows it to find Jahaan and learns about his passion for singing. Jahaan is also mesmerized by her singing. As Elahi approaches Jahaan to practice for the "Great Indian Voice" competition, he disagrees, fearing betrayal. Elahi feels humiliated and goes. Jordan on the other hand goes to Husna's sister's wedding to approach her but she avoids him. Jahaan realises his mistake and tries to apologise to Elahi and they agree to practice at college.  Ilahi comes home and cares for Amar. In morning, Ilahi makes the food and said she will have food in the bus as she's getting late. Amar comes to Biji and says Ilahi will marry by her wish, if anyone threatens then he won’t leave anyone. Ilahi and Jahaan meet on the way. They go to board the bus for the college.

Cast

Main
 Ankit Gupta as Jahaan: Nikki and Baljeet's son (2023–present)
 Neha Rana as Elahi Dosanjh: Armandeep and Diljot's daughter (2023–present)
 Gautam Vig as Jordan Mehta: Indrajeet and Mahi's son (2023–present)

Recurring
 Gurvinder Kaur as Baljeet/Dolly:  Jahaan's mother (2023–present)
 Balwinder Kaur as Diljot Dosanjh: Elahi's mother (2023–present)
 Aman Sutdhar as Amardeep Dosanjh: Elahi's father (2023–present)
 Ram Aujla as Indrajeet Mehta: Jordan's father (2023–present)
 Manasi Salvi as Mahi Mehta: Jordan's mother (2023–present)
 Abhianshu Vohra as Ranjeet: Elahi's lover (2023-present)

Production

Casting
Ankit Gupta as Jahaan, Neha Rana as Ilahi and Gautam Vig as Jordon were signed as the leads.

Development
The series was announced by Dreamiyata Entertainment Pvt. Ltd. for Colors TV in January 2023.

Filming
In January 2023, principal photography commenced in Chandigarh, the series is set in Punjab.

Reception

See also
 List of programmes broadcast by Colors TV

References

External links
 Junooniyatt on Colors TV
 
 Junooniyatt on Voot

2023 Indian television series debuts
2020s Indian television series
Hindi-language television shows
Colors TV original programming
Television shows set in Punjab, India